A state guest house is a building owned by the government of a country which is used as an official residence for visiting foreign dignitaries, especially during state visits or for other important events.

Americas

Canada
 7 Rideau Gate in Ottawa

United States
 Blair House (President's Guest House) in Washington, D.C.

Asia

Bangladesh
 Jamuna State Guest House
 Meghna State Guest House

China
 Diaoyutai State Guesthouse in Beijing

India
 Hyderabad House

Indonesia
 Merdeka Palace
 Jakarta State Palace

Japan
 Akasaka Palace in Tokyo
 Kyoto State Guest House in Kyoto

North Korea
 Paekhwawon State Guest House

Sri Lanka
 Visumpaya

Taiwan
 Taipei Guest House

Turkey
 Ankara Palas

Vietnam
 State Guest House in Hanoi

Europe

Ireland
 Farmleigh in Dublin

Finland
  in Helsinki
 Königstedt Manor just outside Helsinki

France
 Hôtel de Marigny in Paris

Germany
 Hotel Petersberg outside Bonn
 Schloss Meseberg outside Berlin

Italy
 Villa Madama

Poland
 Belweder

Portugal
 Queluz Palace outside Lisbon

Spain
 El Pardo Palace outside Madrid

Vatican
 Domus Sanctae Marthae

Official residences